The Smothers Brothers Play It Straight is the ninth album by the Smothers Brothers (released February 15, 1966 on Mercury Records).  As the title indicates, the folk comedy duo were singing the songs "straight" (well, "Almost").  Like the B-side of their second album, Two Sides of the Smothers Brothers, the recording was done in a studio instead of on stage.  The album cover shows Tom standing with his guitar and Dick sitting on a stool with his bass lying behind him.  There is also a chicken eating chicken-feed, which could be a representation of Frank, Tom's wagon pulling chicken who is discussed on Mom Always Liked You Best!.

Track listing
"Lark Day" (2:47) - Sung by Tom & Dick
"The First Time Ever I Saw Your Face" (3:10) - Sung by Dick
"Yesterday" (2:31) - Sung by Dick
"Little Sacka Sugar" (1:54 ) - Sung by Tom
"Someone to Talk My Troubles To" (3:11) - Sung by Tom & Dick
"Wanderlove" (4:12) - Sung by Dick and written by Mason Williams, who performed it on his The Mason Williams Phonograph Record album
"Hound Dog Blues" (2:41) - Sung and written by Tom
"Down in the Valley" (3:58) - Sung by Tom & Dick, using their arrangement previously recorded on The Smothers Brothers at the Purple Onion
"The Write of Songs" (2:41) - Sung by Dick
"Silver Threads and Golden Needles" (2:25) - Sung by Tom
"People Change" (2:43) - Sung by Dick
"They Are Gone" (2:34) - Sung by Tom & Dick 
"Almost" (5:34) - Dick tries to sing it...

Personnel
Dick Smothers – vocals, double bass
Tom Smothers – vocals, guitar
David Carroll – conductor
Mason Williams – musical director
Warren Baker, Dick Reynolds – arrangements

External links
Complete Smothers Brothers discography

1966 albums
Smothers Brothers albums
Mercury Records albums